Patoki may refer to the following places:
Patoki, Łask County in Łódź Voivodeship (central Poland)
Patoki, Łowicz County in Łódź Voivodeship (central Poland)
Patoki, Podlaskie Voivodeship (north-east Poland)
Patoki, Pomeranian Voivodeship (north Poland)